Carposina mesospila is a moth in the family Carposinidae. It was described by Edward Meyrick in 1920. It is found in Kenya.

References

Endemic moths of Kenya
Carposinidae
Moths described in 1920
Moths of Africa